Eumeta pryeri is a moth of the family Psychidae. It is found in China and Taiwan.

References

Moths described in 1889
Psychidae